Backstabbers Incorporated (sometimes called Backstabbers Inc.  or BSI, and previously known as Life Passed On) were an American hardcore/metal band based in Portsmouth, New Hampshire.

History 

Backstabbers Incorporated was formed as Life Passed On in the late nineties by Matt Serven (guitar) and Ryan McKenney (vocals).  In 2000, a lineup changes prompted the band to change their name to Backstabbers Incorporated.  Brian Serven joined around this time.  They have released albums for Black Market Activities (distributed through Metal Blade) and Trash Art! Records in addition to some splits and EPs on smaller DIY labels.

The band has gone on several US tours, including a short tour in January 2005, and a more extensive East Coast Tour from October to December 2005.  In 2006, the band embarked on a European tour during August and September.  Since a short tour in March 2008 around Dudefest, the band has largely been inactive.

On August 24, 2010 BSI announced via Facebook that their upcoming full-length album would be released on Blackmarket Activities.

January 1st, 2014 saw the release of MIA: a raw, stripped down, claustrophobic Hardcore record. In Spring of 2015 the band re-emerged with yet another line-up change and a brief East Coast/Midwestern Tour.

Musical style 

The band is typically described as punk and hardcore as umbrella terms, but state that other influences such as grindcore, crossover thrash, post-hardcore, and death metal are often present.  The use of a variety of vocal styles, from high pitched screaming to deeper growls, often serve to identify the band in both the hardcore and metal genres.  On their earlier releases they are typically described as more direct and stripped-down, while their later releases such as Kamikaze Missions show an expansion of their sound.  Brian Serven also cites film composers Michael Nyman and Yann Tiersen as influences.

The band is also sometimes tied to the straight edge music culture, due to the Serven's not using drugs or alcohol and being vegan. However, they expressed that these decisions are not tied to any youth-orientated subculture like straight edge, but are personal choices.

Discography 

 Albums
 2003: Bare As Bones (Black Market Activities)
 2004: Kamikaze Missions (Trash Art!)
 2014: Missing In Action (Self Release)

 EPs
 2000: Evolution (Cadmium Sick Records)
 2001: While You Were Sleeping (Trash Art!)
 2002: Theory/History (Element Records)

 Splits
 2001: Bad Cop, No Cop - 7" with Advocate (Black Day Propaganda)
 2003:  People Don't Take Photographs of Things They Want to Forget - with Advocate, Trap Them & Kill Them, Purity's Failure, and Transistor Transistor (Broken Press)

 Demo
 Backstabbers Incorporated (Self-released demo tape)

Members 
 Current
Matt Serven – Guitar, vocals (1998–Present)
Mark Richards (Current)
Anthony Ruscio – Bass (Current)
Mark Blanchard – Drums (Current)

 Former
 Brian Serven Bass, Guitar, Vocals - (2000-2018)
Sean McAlister-Bass
Nick Reddy – Bass (2004-2014)
Jonah Livingston – Drums (2004-2014)
Ryan McKenney – Vocals (1998-?)
Brian Izzi – Guitar (2001- ?)
Mike Justian – Guitar, Drums
Mike Quinn – Drums
Matt Dunn – Drums

External links 
 
 BSI at Black Market Activities
 BSI at Trash Art!

References 

American hardcore punk groups
American grindcore musical groups
Heavy metal musical groups from New Hampshire
Black Market Activities artists
Musical groups established in 2000
Musical groups disestablished in 2008